Corrective Services New South Wales (CSNSW) is a division of the Department of Communities and Justice of the Government of New South Wales, Australia. CSNSW is responsible for the state's prisons and a range of programs for managing offenders in the community. The state has 36 prisons, 33 run by CSNSW and three privately operated. The agency traces its origins back to 1788, when New South Wales was founded as a penal colony.

The services provided include correctional centre custody of remand and sentenced inmates, parole, pre-sentence reports and advice to courts and releasing authorities, community service orders and other forms of community-based offender supervision. Offenders in custody and those supervised in the community are assessed for relevant interventions to reduce their risks of re-offending. Corrective Services NSW works in partnership with other government and non-government justice and human services agencies in regard to inmates in custody and offenders in the community.

The agency head office is in the Henry Deane Building in Haymarket, City of Sydney.

Legislation 
CSNSW's operations are governed by a number of State laws, chief among them the Crimes (Administration of Sentences) Act 1999.

Structure 

CSNSW is a division of the Department of Communities and Justice, headed by Commissioner Kevin Corcoran PSM, who reports to the Acting Secretary of the Department, Catherine D'Elia. Corrective Services NSW is further divided into six branches, each headed by an assistant commissioner:

 Custodial Corrections
 Community Corrections
 Offender Management & Programs
 Security & Intelligence
 Governance & Continuous Improvement
 Corrections Strategy & Policy.

Ministerial oversight of CSNSW is provided by the Minister for Corrections Dr Geoff Lee MP.

Facilities

History

NSW established gaols in Berrima (1836), Cockatoo Island (1839), Darlinghurst (1841), Parramatta (1842), Maitland (1848), and (site of the current Four Seasons hotel located) in The Rocks and later in Goulburn (1884), Bathurst (1888), Broken Hill Correctional Centre (1892) in the state's far west, Long Bay (1909) as the State Reformatory for Women, and Emu Plains (1914). In more recent years, correctional centres (as they are now known) have opened at Parklea (1983), Cessnock, Junee (1993), Lithgow, Silverwater (1997), Brewarrina (2000), John Morony Correctional Centre and Dillwynia Women's Correctional Centre in north-west Sydney, Kempsey (2004), Wellington (2007), and Nowra (2010).

Early years (1788–1874) 

Great Britain started the European settlement of the Colony of New South Wales in 1788, establishing a penal colony at what is now Sydney. The incentive to establishment the colony came from the conclusion (1783) of the American War of Independence, which forced Britain to find ways of dealing with criminals other than transporting them to North America. The initial settlement at Sydney Cove in Port Jackson involved housing convicts in tents, guarded by marines. Further convict shipments followed, and a surge of convicts arrived in Sydney after the Napoleonic Wars ended in 1815. Convicts worked for pay and, where good behaviour was demonstrated, could be assigned to masters. Chain gangs operated from 1826 up until transportation ended in 1840.

In the colony's early years, prisons and executions were managed first by the provost marshal, a military officer, and then, from 1824, by the sheriff.

List of provost marshals and sheriffs

Departments of Prisons (1874–1970) and Corrective Services (1970–8)
The colony established its first Department of Prisons in 1874, with Sheriff Harold Maclean appointed as the first Comptroller-General.

The Department changed its name to 'Corrective Services' in 1970, and McGeechan's title changed to Commissioner. Eight years later, the Wran Government accepted the Royal Commission's recommendation that the post of commissioner be abolished in favour of a three-person Corrective Services Commission.

List of Comptrollers-General

Post-Nagle Royal Commission (1978–2009)
The Government appointed academic Tony Vinson as the chairman of the new Corrective Services Commission. Vinson implemented many of the Royal Commission recommendations, but by 1981 found himself in conflict with the officers' union, the Public Service Association. The Government backed the union in the dispute, and Vinson retired to academia. The tenure of his replacement, Vern Dalton, was memorable for a corruption scandal that saw the Minister for Corrections, Rex Jackson, sentenced to 10 years' gaol for corruption.

Labor, tarnished by this and other scandals, was swept from office in 1988: the Liberal–Nationals coalition that replaced them campaigned on a 'tough on crime' platform. Dalton was moved to a different department and the Corrective Services Commission was abolished in favour of a single director-general on 9 August 1988. The first director-general was former police officer Angus Graham.

In October 1991 the department was restructured, with its juvenile justice responsibilities being transferred to a separate agency and Graham's title changed to Commissioner.

List of commissioners and directors-general of the Department

Corrective Services New South Wales (2009–present)

As part of a broader consolidation of government departments in 2009, the Department of Corrective Services was merged with the departments of the Attorney-General and Juvenile Justice in 2009.  Corrective Services New South Wales became a division of what is now known as the Department of Justice, with Woodham retaining his role as Commissioner. Liberal Attorney-General Greg Smith replaced Woodham with Peter Severin, the head of South Australia's prison service, in 2012.

The NSW prison population has doubled in the last two decades, from 7810 inmates in 1998 to 13,722 in 2018.  Females account for 8% (1040) of the prisoner population in NSW and 24.7% (3300) of inmates are Aboriginal or Torres Strait Islander. The annual expenditure on prisons in NSW in 2018 was $1.16 billion, and the average cost per prisoner per day is $188.

In terms of performance indicators, in 2018 Corrective Services NSW prisons were below average for Australian states and territories for recidivism (51% at two years), assaults (25 per 100 prisoners), deaths in custody (0.07/100 prisoners), participation in education and training (22%), time out of cells (8 hours/day) and prison capacity utilisation (129%).

In 2019, Corrective Services set a target to reduce adult prison inmate reoffending by 5 per cent by 2023.  The prisoner population of NSW is estimated to rise to by 550 inmates a year to 16,402 within five years. In response to prisoner number growth, Corrective Services NSW launched a $3.8 billion program for building new prison capacity in 2016.

List of Corrective Services Commissioners

See also
Alexander Maconochie Centre
Commissioner of Corrective Services (New South Wales)
Department of Communities and Justice
GEO Group Australia
Juvenile Justice NSW
Punishment in Australia
Serco
Villawood Immigration Detention Centre

References

External links 
 Corrective Services NSW

Corrective